Marcinów  is a village in the administrative district of Gmina Zadzim, within Poddębice County, Łódź Voivodeship, in central Poland.

In 2005 the village has a population of 145.

References

Villages in Poddębice County